Vez is a Spanish and Portuguese word meaning time (in the sense of occasion), and thus appears in the titles of a very large number of works such as books, films and songs. It is also a toponym in several countries.

People
 El Vez, Mexican-American singer-songwriter and musician
 Irantzu Garcia Vez (born 1992), Spanish curler
 León Ávalos y Vez (1906–1991), Mexican mechanical engineer
 Sergio Vez (born 1994), Spanish curler

Places
 Vez, Oise, Hauts-de-France, France
 Věž, Vysočina, Czech Republic
 Vaz Mollā, also transliterated Vazmela, Mazandaran, Iran
 Vez River, Portugal

See also
 
 Tal Vez (disambiguation)
 Vèze, Cantal, France